Peter Portisch is a West German para-alpine skier. He represented West Germany in alpine skiing at the 1976 Winter Paralympics.

He won the silver medal at the Men's Slalom II event, the only event he competed in.

See also 
 List of Paralympic medalists in alpine skiing

References 

Living people
Year of birth missing (living people)
Place of birth missing (living people)
Paralympic alpine skiers of Germany
Alpine skiers at the 1976 Winter Paralympics
Medalists at the 1976 Winter Paralympics
Paralympic silver medalists for West Germany
Paralympic medalists in alpine skiing
20th-century German people